California's 58th State Assembly district is one of 80 California State Assembly districts. It is currently represented by Democrat Cristina Garcia of Bell Gardens.

District profile 
The district encompasses a portion of the Gateway Cities region and roughly follows Interstate 605 from Pico Rivera in the north to Cerritos in the south. The district is primarily suburban and heavily Latino.

Los Angeles County – 4.8%
 Artesia
 Bell Gardens
 Bellflower
 Cerritos
 Commerce
 Downey
 Montebello – 89.7%
 Norwalk – 37.8%
 Pico Rivera

Election results from statewide races

List of Assembly Members 
Due to redistricting, the 58th district has been moved around different parts of the state. The current iteration resulted from the 2011 redistricting by the California Citizens Redistricting Commission.

Election results 1992 - present

2020

2018

2016

2014

2012

2010

2008

2006

2004

2002

2000

1998

1996

1994

1992

See also 
 California State Assembly
 California State Assembly districts
 Districts in California

References

External links 
 District map from the California Citizens Redistricting Commission

58
Government of Los Angeles County, California
Artesia, California
Bell Gardens, California
Cerritos, California
Commerce, California
Downey, California
Montebello, California
Norwalk, California
Pico Rivera, California